The Co-op was an academic and professional non-profit books retailer in Australia, founded in 1958 before closing in the first half of 2020.

History 

The Co-op was established by students led by the late Malcolm Broun, Celtophile, bibliophile and lawyer, in 1958 at the University of Sydney and grew to become the largest provider of educational, professional and lifelong learning resources in Australia. The Co-Op once had over 60 branches across Australia with more than 2 million members.

The company was the largest cooperative in Australia, and the second largest book seller. In 2004 it produced a turnover of $75 million.

In 2013, the company acquired book distributor Central Books Services (since renamed Co Info). In August 2016 the company acquired the Australian Geographic retail chain.

In November 2019 the Co-op Bookshop entered voluntary administration. The appointed administrators confirmed they are investigating payments made to a major supplier, controlled by Co-op chief executive Thorsten Wichtendahl, which received more than $500,000 in advance for goods not yet supplied. The on-line business will be sold to Booktopia with the remaining stores to close in the first half of 2020.

Criticisms
Student activists, former board members and co-op members have accused the co-op of drifting away from the original values of the co-operative movement: democratic-engagement, non-profit and transparency. According to the Canberra Times, in the early 90s directors with backgrounds in publishing and academia lost a factional battle to accountants who increased directors’ salaries and gradually made it harder for members to participate in board elections. In 2004, two disenchanted Sydney University Students launched a campaign to elect themselves onto the board to argue for cheaper textbooks and reduced directors’ salaries. They claim the co-op responded by adding more obstacles to student participation, such as moving their AGMs to Hobart, increasing the number of members’ signatures required to call SGMs from 200 to 10,000  and introducing requirements to be elected to the board that students cannot meet. Currently, to be elected to the board an individual must: 1) "demonstrate participation in the management and direction of a medium to large size business of not less than five years in aggregate" and 2) "have graduated from a recognized University...or TAFE degree”. In 2016, Chief Executive Officer Thorsten Wichtendahl told Student Magazine Farrago, “Quite frankly, I wouldn’t want to be reporting to a 21-year-old, first-year uni student. I take my guidance, strategic direction, coaching and mentoring from our board of directors – experienced company directors.”

References

External links
The Co-op Online Bookshop Official Website
 Students stranded as unco-operative bookshop hits the road

Bookshops of Australia
2020 disestablishments in Australia
Australian companies established in 1958
Retail companies established in 1959